Miguel Aracil Arnau (born 18 February 1957 in Alicante, Valencian Community) is a Spanish retired footballer who played as a right defender and midfielder.

Aracil spent eleven seasons playing professional football with Hércules CF, captaining the side through its most successful period during the 1970s and 1980s. In 1984, Aracil won the Copa de la Liga with Real Valladolid.

After he retired from playing, Aracil became a football coach. He worked in Hércules' youth and second teams until 2013.

Honours
Valladolid
Copa de la Liga: 1983–84

References

External links
 

1957 births
Living people
Footballers from Alicante
Spanish footballers
Association football defenders
Association football midfielders
La Liga players
Segunda División players
Hércules CF players
Real Valladolid players
Spain under-21 international footballers
Spain under-23 international footballers
Spain amateur international footballers